American country singer-songwriter Dolly Parton has composed over 5,000 songs throughout her career. The total number of individual song titles she has recorded and released is 956, totaling over 1,100 individual recordings when studio recordings, remixes, and live tracks are combined.

After releasing two unsuccessful singles as a teenager, Parton moved to Nashville, Tennessee in 1964 and signed a recording contract with Monument Records and released a series of singles on the label, the highest charting being her 1965 single "Happy, Happy Birthday Baby". In September 1967, Monument released Parton's debut solo album, Hello, I'm Dolly, containing the hits "Dumb Blonde" and "Something Fishy", which reached number 24 and number 17, respectively. Also in September 1967, Parton was asked to replace country vocalist Norma Jean as the "girl singer" on Porter Wagoner's syndicated television series The Porter Wagoner Show. The pair recorded 13 albums together for RCA Victor, and in the late 1960s and early 1970s had a series of top 10 hits on the country charts, including "The Last Thing on My Mind", "Tomorrow Is Forever", and "Daddy Was an Old Time Preacher Man". On Wagoner's television series, Parton gained a national audience of millions of viewers, and her own singles began to move up the country charts. By the early 1970s, her solo hits regularly appeared in the top 10, as did her duets with Wagoner. Her first chart-topper, 1970's "Joshua", followed by 1971's "Coat of Many Colors", 1972's "Touch Your Woman", and 1973's "Traveling Man" and "Jolene", all reached the top 10 on the US country singles chart, with "Jolene" becoming her second number one single in February 1974.  In mid-1974, Parton split from Wagoner and his show in order to expand her career as a solo artist, writing and recording the number one hit, "I Will Always Love You" as a tribute to Wagoner.

Following her departure from Wagoner's show, Parton branched out into pop music with the 1977 single "Here You Come Again", which hit number one on the country chart and number three on the Billboard Hot 100, helping to produce a string of crossover hits in the late 1970s and early 1980s, including "Two Doors Down", "Heartbreaker", "You're the Only One", "9 to 5" and "But You Know I Love You".

After a slight commercial decline in the late 1980s, Parton signed with Columbia Records and returned to traditional country music with the album White Limozeen, which spawned the number one country singles, "Why'd You Come in Here Lookin' Like That" and "Yellow Roses". Two more traditional-themed albums were released in the early 1990s that were also successful, Eagle When She Flies (1991) and Slow Dancing with the Moon (1993).

In 1999 she signed a contract with Sugar Hill Records and recorded a series of Bluegrass albums, beginning with The Grass Is Blue in 1999, followed by Little Sparrow (2001) and Halos & Horns (2002). In 2007 she formed her own record label, Dolly Records and the following year issued her first mainstream country album in over 10 years, Backwoods Barbie. That album produced five singles, including the minor country hit, "Better Get to Livin'", which peaked at number 48 on the Billboard country chart.

Parton holds the record for the most number one hits by a female country artist (25) and the record for most top 10 country albums on the Billboard Top Country Albums chart (41). She previously held the record for the most top 10 hits by a female country artist until Reba McEntire surpassed her in 2009 with her 56th top 10 hit, "Cowgirls Don't Cry".  Parton is the first artist to have top 20 hits on Billboard's Hot Country Songs chart in six consecutive decades (1960s–2010s).

Released songs
The table below lists every song recorded by Dolly Parton that has been commercially released. For the purpose of this table a song is considered commercially released if it was available on a single or album (regardless of whether or not the release was sanctioned by Parton) or was featured in a movie or television show.

Notes

References

Parton, Dolly
Songs